Her Harem (released in UK as The Harem) is a 1967 Italian comedy-drama film written and directed by Marco Ferreri and starring Carroll Baker, Gastone Moschin and Renato Salvatori.

Plot
A woman has a number of male lovers so, during a holiday in Dubrovnik, she puts them together, with a stratagem, in her villa, in a sort of reverse harem.

Cast

Carroll Baker as Margherita
Gastone Moschin as  Gianni
Renato Salvatori as  Gaetano
William Berger as  Mike
Michel Le Royer as  René
Clotilde Sakaroff as Gaetano's mother
Ugo Tognazzi as himself

Production
It was the first film Baker made in Europe. She was having difficulties in her career in Hollywood and was offered the role when she met the director at the Venice Film Festival.

Baker says the film was meant to be a comedy but the director "lost his courage at the last minute... it would have been wonderful as a comedy but he cut out all the funny scenes and put a serious ending on it."

Reception
The film was a box office flop - "Harem just didn't work out," Baker later said, "those things happen." However it launched a successful career for Baker in Europe.

References

External links

1967 films
Italian romantic comedy-drama films
1960s romantic comedy-drama films
Films set in Croatia
Films directed by Marco Ferreri
Films scored by Ennio Morricone
1967 drama films
1960s Italian-language films
1960s Italian films